Cylindrothorax balteatus is a species of beetle in the family Cerambycidae, and the only species in the genus Cylindrothorax. It was described by Heath in 1903.

References

Sternotomini
Beetles described in 1903